Seraj Kola (also Romanized as Serāj Kolā; also known as Serāj Kolā-ye Pā’īn) is a village in Balatajan Rural District, in the Central District of Qaem Shahr County, Mazandaran Province, Iran. At the 2006 census, its population was 1,246, in 329 families.

References 

Populated places in Qaem Shahr County